Keeley Forsyth is an English actress and musician. She has released the albums Debris (2020) and Limbs (2022).

Acting 

Forsyth's first acting role was as Nicky in the BBC children's television series The Biz in 1995, appearing alongside Paul Nicholls. She subsequently appeared in several television series, including Peak Practice, Where the Heart Is, Casualty, Heartbeat, The Bill, Dalziel and Pascoe, Holby City, The Line of Beauty, Luther, Waterloo Road, Criminal Justice, Coronation Street, Sons and Lovers, New Tricks (S8:E7, 2011). She has also performed for Real Circumstance Theatre Company.

In 2001, Forsyth appeared in an all-star Family Fortunes: Heartbeat vs Peak Practice edition. In 2015, she appeared as Terri Weedon in the BBC TV mini series The Casual Vacancy. In 2016, she appeared as Annette in the second series of Happy Valley.

Music 
In October 2019, Forsyth released the single "Debris" on The Leaf Label, followed by "Start Again", with accompanying video by Andrew Hulme, in January 2020. Her debut album of the same name, released on 17 January 2020, features "minimal arrangements" that feature Forsyth's "elemental voice and an outpouring of candid, haunting lyrics". The album also features fellow Leaf Label artist and pianist Matthew Bourne. Talking to The Line of Best Fit, she detailed the inception of the record and finding Bourne via the BBC's Late Junction: "I recorded all my stuff on the harmonium and gave it to him. I was meant to re-record my voice over his sounds, but he sent back what he heard on the harmonium – the chords, the keys, the silences, the breaths in and out – and it was just like, wow. I was stunned and I didn't really do anything with it for a little while [...] He's the only person who I know making music who lives close enough for me to make anything happen." The album was praised by Pitchfork, The Quietus and Loud and Quiet. It also made 2020's 'end of year lists' in The Quietus, Norman Records, The Line Of Best Fit, Loud And Quiet, Resident and Rough Trade.

Speaking to The Guardian in January 2020 Forsyth shared plans to develop a live performance in collaboration with film-makers Iain Forsyth and Jane Pollard.

She released Photograph in November 2020. The EP "suggests a broadening of Forsyth's musical horizons" and was featured in Rough Trade's Top 100 and Uncut's albums of the year.

In 2022 she released her second album, Limbs, to critical acclaim.

References

External links 

A Path Through Darkness: Keeley Forsyth Interviewed, The Quietus

Living people
Actresses from Oldham
English television actresses
English women pop singers
20th-century English actresses
21st-century English actresses
Musicians from Greater Manchester
Year of birth missing (living people)